Emerita may refer to:

Emerita (crustacean), a genus of crustaceans
Emerita Augusta, an ancient city of Spain
 Saint Emerita, 3rd-century martyr; see Digna and Emerita
 Emerita, the feminine form of the adjective "emeritus", added to the title professor or religious leader to honor them for lengthy service